Sianow may refer to:
Sianow, Iran (disambiguation)
Sianów, Poland